Jeffersonville High School is a public high school located in Jeffersonville, Indiana. The school serves students in grades 9 through 12 from Jeffersonville, Utica, and sections of Clarksville not covered by that town's own high school. The school's enrollment for the 2014–2015 school year was 2,051 students, with 123 teachers. The current principal is Pam Hall. Jeffersonville is in the school district of Greater Clark County Schools. This school district includes Charlestown addresses that are connected with the city of Jeffersonville.  While most schools in other counties have a majority European ratio of students, Jeffersonville total minority enrollment is 36%.

2013–2014 academic statistics

Graduation rate: 93.6%
ISTEP+ passing rate: 47.4%
ECA (End-of-Course Assessments) passing rate: 63.9%
Percentage of graduates taking the SAT: 31.5%
Average SAT composite score: 960
Percentage of graduates taking the ACT: 19.7%
Average ACT composite score: 21
Percentage of graduates taking an Advanced Placement exam: 48.9%
Percentage of graduates passing an AP exam: 18.9%

There is no information yet regarding the 2014–2015 school year.

Jeffersonville High School was placed on academic probation in accordance with Public Law 221 for the 2007–2008 and 2009–2010 school years, and has not made Adequate Yearly Progress since at least prior to the 2006–2007 school year. There was no PL221 or AYP calculation for the 2008–2009 school year because of a change in spring testing.

Extracurricular accomplishments

Sports
Jeffersonville High School Red Devil student athletes have consistently brought home sectional, regional, and state championship victories, and other athletic accomplishments. Below are a few of the Red Devils' athletic accomplishments.

The Red Devils won the 1993 IHSAA Class 4A boys basketball championship.
The Lady Red Devils won the 2011 IHSAA Class 4A girls basketball championship.

JROTC
JHS' Air Force JROTC unit advanced to Round II of the AFJROTC Academic Bowl in 2012.  The unit has also won awards for its color guard and drill team.
The Jeffersonville High School Air Force JROTC Academic Bowl Team qualified for the National Championship in Washington, DC during the 2019–2020 season. However, due to COVID-19, this event was cancelled.
During the 2020–2021 season, the JHS Air Force JROTC Academic Bowl Team qualified once again for the National Championship, this time able to participate in-person at the Catholic University of America in Washington, DC. The team won 3rd place out of 470 Air Force JROTC teams from various high schools across the United States.

Theatre

Jeffersonville High School has a prominent theatre program that has sent seven shows to the International Thespian Festival in Nebraska, one which continued to the Fringe Festival in Scotland.

Band

The Jeffersonville Winter Percussion Ensemble received the silver medal at the 2008 TriState Circuit Championships, Percussion Scholastic A section, with a score of 85.10—the highest score ever set by a Jeffersonville Indoor Drumline.
The Jeffersonville High School Wind Symphony was a finalist at the Indiana State School Music Association state-level event in 2007.
Jeffersonville High School was selected as Grammy Signature School in 2012.
The Jeffersonville High School Marching Band actively competes in Bands of America competitions.
The Jeffersonville High School Marching Band won the title of Grand Champion at Louisville Male Invitational in 2011
The Jeffersonville High School Winterguard received the gold medal at the 2012 Tristate Circuit Championships, in Class B.  
The Jeffersonville High School Winterguard received the Gold Medal (Grand Champions) at the 2013 Tristate Circuit Championships, in Class A3. 
The Jeffersonville High School Winterguard received the silver medal at the 2014 Tristate Circuit Championships, in Class A2. 
The Wind Symphony and Symphonic Band performed in Carnegie Hall on April 13, 2015.

Notable alumni

Admiral Jonas Ingram - Medal of Honor recipient and Commander-in-Chief, United States Atlantic Fleet during World War II
John Schnatter - Founder and former CEO of Papa John's Pizza
Jermaine Ross - Former NFL player for the St. Louis Rams and Jacksonville Jaguars
Ben Hesen - Champion collegiate swimmer and US Open record holder in the 50M backstroke
Walt Terrell - Former MLB pitcher for the New York Mets, San Diego Padres, New York Yankees, Pittsburgh Pirates and the Detroit Tigers
Sarah Bridges - professional wrestler for WWE under the ring name Sarah Logan

See also
 List of high schools in Indiana
 Hoosier Hills Conference
 Jeffersonville, Indiana

References

External links

 
 Jeff Red Devils
 Department of Education Statistics
 IN-061 ROTC Program
 IHSAA – Play On

Public high schools in Indiana
High School
Schools in Clark County, Indiana
Educational institutions established in 1870
1870 establishments in Indiana